Peach rosette mosaic virus (PRMV) is a plant pathogenic virus of the family Secoviridae, infecting peaches and nectarines, and grapevine.

External links
ICTVdB - The Universal Virus Database: Peach rosette mosaic virus
Family Groups - The Baltimore Method

Viral plant pathogens and diseases
Stone fruit tree diseases
Viral grape diseases
Nepoviruses